Roseburg may refer:

In the United States:
Roseburg, Grant County, Indiana
Roseburg, Union County, Indiana
Roseburg, Kentucky 
Roseburg, Michigan 
Roseburg, Oregon 
Roseburg, Pennsylvania

In Germany:
Roseburg, Schleswig-Holstein